Robert Israel may refer to:
 Bob Israel (composer), composer primarily of television themes and record producer
 Bob Israel (film producer), co-producer of movies Ace Ventura: Pet Detective, Bachelor Party and others
 Robert Israel (composer), composer primarily of silent film scores
 Robert Israel, lighthouse keeper